Petőfi híd or Petőfi Bridge (named after Sándor Petőfi, old name is Horthy Miklós Bridge, named after governor Miklós Horthy) is a bridge in Budapest, connecting Pest and Buda across the Danube. It is the second southernmost public bridge in Budapest.

Its two ends are:
 Boráros tér (southern end of Grand Boulevard and terminus of the Csepel HÉV)
 Goldmann György tér (next to the campuses of the Budapest University of Technology and Economics)

Budapest already made a proposal in the early 1900s to build the bridge, but the competent state bodies believed that a bridge in Óbuda was much more important. After the start of World War I., the idea was postponed, however, the bridge was still important for the townspeople.

The bridge was built between 1933–1937, according to the plans of Hubert Pál Álgyay. It is 514 m in length (along with the sections leading up) and 25.6 m in width and was rebuilt after the Second World War.

See also
Bridges of Budapest
List of crossings of the Danube River

References

External links
 DBridges - Petőfi híd
 Photos of Budapest bridges
 
 Bridges of Budapest - Petofi Bridge

Bridges in Budapest
Bridges completed in 1937
Bridges over the Danube